Bílinská kyselka (in English: Biliner, Bílina acidulous water) is strongly mineralized alkaline bicarbonate (i.e. 5 to 7 grams per litre) mineral water from Bílina city (Czech Republic). Particularly sodium, potassium, calcium, magnesium, and iron are present as cations, as are anions of chloride, sulfate, and bicarbonate. The temperature of spring water ranges between 17 and 20 °C. (63 - 68 °F). Due to the high content of free carbon dioxide is naturally carbonated and packaged without additional chemical modifications. Water is collected from a borehole from a depth of 191 m under the mountain Bořeň. Biliner is available in Europe in one liter and 500 ml bottles. Biliner bottles are cobalt blue polyethylene terephthalate.

Near the source Bílinská Kyselka originated from 16th-century spa buildings of Biliner Sauerbrunn Spa, Kyselka Spa. Spa was built by the princely House of Lobkowicz.

The authors of the first scientific publications were balneologists Franz Ambrosius Reuss, August Emanuel von Reuss, and Josef von Löschner.

See also
Zaječická hořká

References

External links 

 biliner.co.uk UK page
 biliner.com USA page
 biliner.cz Springs Direction and Bottling factory
 Bílinská kyselka on Mineralwaters.org
 Josef Löschner, Der Sauerbrunnen zu Bilin in Böhmen therapeutisch geschildert. (German)

Mineral water
Bottled water brands
Czech drinks
Czech brands
Teplice District